The East Bengal Regiment is an infantry regiment (regimental system type) and the largest military formation of the Bangladesh Army.

History 
The East Bengal Regiment was formed on 15 February 1948, following the partition of India and the creation of Pakistan in 1947. As the infantry of the newly formed Pakistan Army was made up exclusively of men from West Pakistan, it was seen as a necessity to raise a regiment in East Pakistan. Two companies composed of Bengali Muslims from the British Indian Army Pioneer Corps and Bihar Regiment allotted to the Pakistan Army were regimented in to the first training regiment of the East Bengal Regiment under Lieutenant Colonel V. J. E. Patterson as Commanding Officer and Major Abdul Waheed Choudhury as Officer Commanding (O.C.). Between 1948 and 1965, a total of eight battalions were raised. The East Bengal Regiment was primarily composed of Bengali men from East Pakistan.

1965 Indo-Pakistani War
At the end of the Indo-Pakistani War in 1965, a new battalion called the Lucky Tigers of the 7th East Bengal Regiment was created. The creation of the battalion was not finished until 1966. The East Bengal regiment soldiers defended Lahore, West Pakistan during the war. In which they were awarded 12 gallantry awards.

History during the Bangladesh War of Independence
In March 1971, in response to a crackdown on local populace in East Pakistan, the five battalions of the East Bengal Regiment declared independence and organized and initiated the Bangladesh War of Independence. The East Bengal Regiment formed the core of the independence struggle forces, which became known as the Bangladesh Forces. The structure and formation of the Bangladesh Forces during the Independence War of 1971 was determined at the Sector Commander's Conference that was held from 11 to 17 July 1971.

Colonel M.A.G. Osmani (promoted to general (after independence) was Commander-in-Chief of all Bangladesh Forces. Lieutenant Colonel M. A. Rab was appointed as Chief of Army Staff and Flight Lieutenant M. Hamidullah Khan, later received battlefield promotion to squadron leader, was appointed Bangladesh Military Representative to coordinate guerilla training at the largest training camp of the war effort at Chakulia, Bihar. The decision of the formation of three separate brigades were formed with East Bengal Regiments.
The East Bengal Regiments that participated in the war were as follows:

Z Force, by then commanded by Lieutenant Colonel Ziaur Rahman, consisted of 1st, 3rd and 8th East Bengal Regiment. These regiments were formed during May~June 1971 at Teldhala village of Tura, Meghalaya, in 1971 by Ziaur Rahman. These three regiments principally constituted the backbone of Bangladesh Forces Sector 11, later commanded for a brief stint (24 days) by Major Abu Taher, and subsequently by Squadron Leader M. Hamidullah Khan from 3 November until 14 February. The main two battles fought in Bangladesh Forces Sector 11 was the Kamalpur battle (land attack) and the Chilmari Amphibious landing raid.

K Force, commanded by Major Khaled Mosharraf was created with 4, 9 and 10 East Bengal.

S Force, under Major K M Shafiullah, was created in October 1971 and consisted of 2 and 11 East Bengal. Further units were raised to replace those that remained stranded in West Pakistan. Following the foundation of Bangladesh, these units formed the core of the new army. However, the 7th Battalion was incorporated as 44th Battalion, Frontier Force Regiment in the Pakistan Army, which led to the raising of the 10th Battalion in 1971.

Role
The East Bengal Regiment is the largest formation of the Bangladesh Army. Its role is to engage and defeat an enemy in frontal combat, within a traditional infantry combat scenario. The regiment also aids the civilian government when called on and contributes regularly to Bangladesh's peacekeeping commitments overseas. Bangladesh is among the countries contributing troops to the United Nations.
 UNOCI
 12th East Bengal Regiment
 13th East Bengal Regiment
 UNMIL
 14th East Bengal Regiment
 MONUSCO
 15th East Bengal Regiment

See also
 Bangladesh Infantry Regiment
 Senior Tigers

References

Further reading 
 
 
 
 
 

Bangladesh Army
Military units and formations established in 1948
Regiments of Bangladesh
Former infantry regiments of Pakistan